The 2009 Jacksonville Dolphins football team represented Jacksonville University as a member of the Pioneer Football League (PFL) during the 2009 NCAA Division I FCS football season. The Dolphins were led by third-year head coach Kerwin Bell and played their home games at D. B. Milne Field in Jacksonville, Florida. They finished the season 7–4 overall and 6–2 in PFL play to tie for fourth place.

Schedule

References

Jacksonville
Jacksonville Dolphins football seasons
Jacksonville Dolphins football